Capparis uniflora is a species of plant in the Capparaceae family. It is endemic to Panama.

References

uniflora
Endemic flora of Panama
Data deficient plants
Taxonomy articles created by Polbot